The Yellow Room may refer to

 The Yellow Room (1891), a work of sadism and masochism in fiction
 The Yellow Room (1945), a novel by Mary Roberts Rinehart
 The Mystery of the Yellow Room (1907), a detective story by Gaston Leroux
 Bedroom in Arles, a painting by Vincent van Gogh
 The Yellow Oval Room in the White House, Washington, DC